The Mönchgut Coastal Fishing Museum in the German Baltic Sea resort of Baabe shows the methods of production used by fishermen living on Mönchgut, who were influential boat builders. The museum opened on 2 June 2001.

The exhibits include, among others, the 9.20 m long motorboat Ossi. The parish of Baabe acquired it after it was decommissioned, along with many other fishing boats built in Baabe. In addition, the museum displays so-called Motorreusenboote - motor boats with bow nets, including the Polk (an Anlandungsboot) complete with its original traps. The exhibition also includes a herring sorting machine, information boards about fishing and boat building as well as personalities of the local fishery.

The museum is open all-year round.

References

External links 
The Coastal Fishing Museum at www.moenchguter-museen-ruegen.de 

Museums in Mecklenburg-Western Pomerania
Maritime museums in Germany
Vorpommern-Rügen
Mönchgut
Rügen
Museums established in 2001
2001 establishments in Germany
Fishing museums
Fishing in Germany